Akkad (or Agade, Akkadian:  , also  URIKI in Sumerian during the Ur III period) was the name of a Mesopotamian city. Akkad was the capital of the Akkadian Empire, which was the dominant political force in Mesopotamia during a period of about 150 years in the last third of the 3rd millennium BC.

Its location is unknown, although there are a number of candidate sites, mostly situated east of the Tigris, roughly between the modern cities of Samarra and Baghdad.

Textual sources

Before the decipherment of cuneiform in the 19th century, the city was known only from a single reference in  where it is written  (ʾĂkăḏ), rendered in the KJV as Accad. The name appears in a list of the cities of Nimrod in Sumer (Shinar).

Walther Sallaberger and Westenholz (1999) cite 160 known mentions of the city in the extant cuneiform corpus, in sources ranging in date from the Old Akkadian period itself down to the Neo-Babylonian period. The name is spelled logographically as URIKI, or phonetically as a-ga-dèKI, variously transcribed into English as Akkad, Akkade or Agade. In 544 BC the "governor of the city of Akkad and a scribe delivered 100 sheep to the Ebabbara Temple in Sippar".

The etymology of the name is unclear, but it is not of Akkadian (Semitic) origin. Various suggestions have proposed Sumerian, Hurrian or Lullubian etymologies. The non-Akkadian origin of the city's name suggests that the site may have already been occupied in pre-Sargonic times. It was suggested, in 1935, that a mention of Agade in one pre-Sargonic year-name "may prove to
be Presargon".

The inscription on the Bassetki Statue records that the inhabitants of Akkad built a temple for Naram-Sin after he had crushed a revolt against his rule.

The main goddess of Akkad was Ishtar (Inanna), who was called ‘Aštar-annunîtum or "Warlike Ishtar". It has also been suggested that a different aspect, Istar-Ulmašītum, was the patron goddess of the city of Akkad. Her husband Ilaba was also revered in Akkad. Ishtar and Ilaba were later worshipped at Sippar in the Old Babylonian period, possibly because Akkad itself had been destroyed by that time. The city was certainly in ruins by the mid-first millennium BC.

Sargon (2334–2279 BC), the first ruler of the Akkadian Empire referred to ships, from Meluhha, Magan and Dilmun, docked at the quay of Agade in a text.

Harris (1977) reports that list of slaves from the Old Babylonian city of Sippar mention "The city of Akkad is the birthplace of either the slave-owner or of the slave-girls who are named Taram-Agade and Taram-Akkadi". The former is the name of a daughter of  Akkadian ruler Naram-Sin several centuries beforehand.

Lewy (1959) outlined that the Amorite king Shamshi-Adad (1808–1776 BC) went to the cities of "Rapiqum and Akkad" as part of  one of his military campaigns, in this case against Eshnunna.

The prologue of the Laws of Hammurabi (circa 1750 BC) includes the phrase "‘the one who installs Ištar in the temple Eulmaš inside Akkade ribıtu".

The Kassite ruler Kurigalzu I (circa 1375 BC) reported refurbishing the city of Agade.

The Elamite ruler Shutruk-Nakhunte (1184 to 1155 BC) conquered part of Mesopotamia, noting that he defeated Sippar. As part of the spoils some millennium old royal Akkadian statues were taken back to Susa including the Victory Stele of Naram-Sin and a statue of the Akkadian ruler Manishtushu. It is unknown if the statues were taken from Akkad or had been moved to Sippar.

A year name of En-šakušuana, king of Uruk (c. 2350 BC) was "Year in which En-šakušuana defeated Akkad". This would have been shortly before the rise of the Akkadian Empire and part of his northern campaign that also defeated Kish and Akshak.

Location

Many older proposals put Akkad on the Euphrates, but more recent discussions conclude that a location on the Tigris is more likely.

The identification of Akkad with Sippar ša Annunîtum (modern Tell ed-Der), along a canal opposite Sippar ša Šamaš (Sippar, modern Tell Abu Habba) was rejected by Unger (1928) based on a Neo-Babylonian text (6th century BC) that lists Sippar ša Annunîtum and Akkad as separate places.

Excavations have shown that the remains at Ishan Mizyad date to the Akkadian period (about 200 Old Akkadian administrative texts found, mainly lists of workers), Ur III period, Isin-Larsa period, and Neo-Babylonian period. Until Neo-Babylonian times a canal ran from Kish to Mizyad.

Discussion since the 1990s has focused on sites along or east of the Tigris. Wall-Romana (1990) suggested a location near the confluence of the Diyala River with the Tigris, and more specifically Tell Muhammad (Tell Mohammad, possibly Diniktum) in the south-eastern suburbs of Baghdad as the likeliest candidate for Akkad, although admitting that no remains datable to the Akkadian period had been found at the site. Excavations found remains dating to the Isin-Larsa, Old Babylonian, and Kassite periods.

Sallaberger and Westenholz (1999) suggested a location close to the confluence of the ʿAdhaim river east of Samarra (at or near Dhuluiya). Similarly, Reade (2002) suggested a site in this vicinity, by Qādisiyyah, based on a fragment of an Old Akkadian statue (now in the British Museum) found there. This had been suggested much earlier by Lane.

The area of the Little Zab river, which originates in Iran and joins the Tigris just south of Al Zab in the Kurdistan region of Iraq, has also been suggested.

Based on an Old Babylonian period itinerary from Mari, Akkad would be on the Tigris just downstream of the current city of Baghdad. Mari documents also indicate that Akkad is sited at a river crossing.

An Old Babylonian prisoner record from the time of Rīm-Anum of Uruk in the 18th century BC implies that Akkad is in the area of Eshnunna, in the Diyala Valley north-west of Sumer proper. It has also been suggested that Akkad was under the control of Eshnunna in that period. It is also known that the rulers of Eshnunna continued cult activities in the city of Akkad.

Khalid al-Admi proposed, based on a kudurru dating to the time of Kassite ruler Marduk-nadin-ahhe (1095–1078 BC), with an earlier one dated to the reign of Nebuchadnezzar I (1121–1100 BC), that Akkad had been renamed sometime in the 2nd millennium. The suggestion from the kuduru is that the name would be Dur-Sharru-Kin, which is not to be confused with the one built by the Neo-Assyrians in the 8th century BC. The location would be "on the bank of the river Nish-Gatti in the district of Milikku". The most likely site would be Dur-Rimush (Tell el-Mjelaat).

On the Kassite Land grant to Marduk-apla-iddina I by Meli-Shipak II (1186–1172 BC) the recipient is given land in communal land of the city of Agade located around the settlement of Tamakku adjacent to the Nar Sarri (Canal of the King) in Bīt-Piri’-Amurru, north of the "land of Istar-Agade" and east of KIbati canal.

See also

Cities of the Ancient Near East
History of Mesopotamia
List of kings of Akkad

References

Sources

Akkadian cities
Akkadian Empire
Lost ancient cities and towns
Archaeological sites in Iraq
Former populated places in Iraq
Levant
Nimrod